The Union Monument in Louisville is located in Cave Hill Cemetery in Louisville, Kentucky.  It was built in 1914 from granite, honoring unknown soldiers who fought in the Union during the American Civil War. It is in front of the large number of Union soldiers buried at Cave Hill.

The inscription on the monument reads: "In Memory of Unknown Union Soldiers in This Cemetery 1861-1865 Erected by Kentucky Comrades—1914".

The monument was one of sixty American Civil War monuments in Kentucky that were listed together on the National Register of Historic Places in 1997.

See also
 32nd Indiana Monument
 Confederate Monument in Louisville
 List of American Civil War monuments in Kentucky
 Louisville in the American Civil War

References

Civil War Monuments of Kentucky MPS
Louisville, Kentucky, in the American Civil War
National Register of Historic Places in Louisville, Kentucky
Union (American Civil War) monuments and memorials in Kentucky
1914 sculptures
1914 establishments in Kentucky
Granite sculptures in Kentucky